0+1=1 (I Promise You) is the second extended play by South Korean boy group Wanna One, a project group created through the 2017 Mnet survival show, Produce 101 Season 2, composed of eleven trainees from different entertainment companies that will promote for 18 months under YMC Entertainment. The album was released digitally and physically on March 19, 2018, by YMC Entertainment, Stone Music Entertainment and CJ E&M Music.

Background and release
On February 26, Wanna One announced the release date of the special theme track and their second mini-album, titled 0+1=1 (I Promise You). The special theme track, "I Promise You (I.P.U.)" was released on March 5 along with its music video, marking the 333rd day since the group's first public appearance. The title track "Boomerang" was released on March 19 along with the album. "Boomerang" is an electro trap song that talks about one's heart reaching out to a significant other and returning after making a connection.

Promotion
Wanna One held a comeback show on March 19, which was broadcast live on Mnet. It showcases the group's performances of their new songs as well as behind-the-scenes footage of their music video.

Commercial performance
On March 5, it was announced that the number of pre-orders for the album has surpassed 700,000 copies, breaking the previous record set by the group. "I Promise You (I.P.U.)" topped six online music charts of six major music sites: Melon, Genie, Bugs, Mnet, Naver and Soribada; and achieved a real-time "all-kill" status on the day of its release. The song also won first place on Show! Music Core and Show Champion without any promotion.

Track listing

Charts

Weekly charts

Year-end charts

Certifications

References

2018 EPs
Korean-language EPs
YMC Entertainment EPs
Wanna One albums